
Year 324 BC was a year of the pre-Julian Roman calendar. At the time, it was known as the Year of the Dictatorship of Cursor (or, less frequently, year 430 Ab urbe condita). The denomination 324 BC for this year has been used since the early medieval period, when the Anno Domini calendar era became the prevalent method in Europe for naming years.

Events 
 By place 

 Macedonian Empire 
 On returning to Susa, Persia, Alexander the Great punishes those who he considers to have failed in their duties in his absence in India, particularly those who have plundered tombs and temples. Alexander continues his policy of replacing senior officials and executing defaulting governors. Over a third of his satraps are replaced and six are put to death. Three generals in Media, including Cleander, the brother of Coenus (who died in 326 BC), are accused of extortion and are arrested, tried and executed.
 While at Susa, Alexander holds a feast to celebrate his capture of the Persian Empire.
 To further his policy of integrating the Macedonians and Persians, Alexander and 80 of his officers take Persian wives. He and Hephaestion marry Darius III's daughters Barsine (also called Stateira) and Drypteis, respectively, and 10,000 of his soldiers with native wives are given generous dowries. His determination to incorporate Persians on equal terms into his army and into the administration of the provinces is bitterly resented by the Macedonians.
 Alexander the Great spends the summer and autumn at the Median capital, Ecbatana, where his best friend, Hephaistion, dies during the autumn. Alexander indulges in extravagant mourning for his closest friend.
 Winter – Alexander carries out a savage punitive expedition against the Cossaeans in the hills of Luristan.

 Greece 
 Alexander the Great's treasurer, Harpalus, fearing arrest, flees from Susa to Athens. On arriving in Athens, he is imprisoned by the Athenians after a proposal of Demosthenes and Phocion, despite Hypereides' opposition, who wanted an immediate uprising against Alexander. Harpalus brings with him considerable wealth collected from the spoils of Alexander's conquest of Asia. This money is entrusted to a committee led by Demosthenes.
 Dinarchus, a professional speech writer in Athens, comes to prominence in the scandal that follows the flight to Athens of Alexander the Great's treasurer, Harpalus. When Harpalus escapes and flees to Crete, Dinarchus writes the prosecution speeches against Demosthenes, Demades, Aristogiton, Philocles and other well-known politicians accused of misappropriating some of this money.
 Demosthenes is convicted and imprisoned after being found guilty of misappropriating some of the funds that Alexander's treasurer, Harpalus, has brought with him. He escapes into exile, although his sentence is soon repealed. Although Hypereides has supported Demosthenes in his struggle against the Macedonians, that support is withdrawn after the Harpalus affair. After Demosthenes' exile, Hypereides becomes the head of the patriotic party in Athens.
 Greek colonists found the city of Akra Leuka (modern Alicante, Spain) on the Mediterranean coast of the Iberian peninsula.

Births 
 Antiochus I Soter, King of the Seleucid dynasty (d. 261 BC)

Deaths 
 Hephaestion, son of Amyntor, a Macedonian general, soldier, aristocrat, and possibly lover of Alexander the Great (b. c. 356 BC)

References